The 2011 Spa-Francorchamps GP3 Series round was a GP3 Series motor race held on August 27 and 28, 2011 at Circuit de Spa-Francorchamps, Belgium. It was the seventh round of the 2011 GP3 Series. The race supported the 2011 Belgian Grand Prix.

Classification

Race 1

Notes
 – Laine received a fifteen place grid penalty for exiting the pitlane when a red light was showing and completing a lap of the track at the end of the practice session.
 – Da Costa was excluded from the qualifying results due to the car not complying with the technical regulations.

Race 2

Standings after the round

Drivers' Championship standings

Teams' Championship standings

 Note: Only the top five positions are included for both sets of standings.

See also 
 2011 Belgian Grand Prix
 2011 Spa-Francorchamps GP2 Series round

References

External links
GP3 Series official website: Results

Spa
GP3 Spa